La Rubia Mireya is a 1948 Argentine film. It is the story of a woman who was reluctantly married, divorced, and rejected by her daughter.

Cast
Fernando Lamas
Mecha Ortiz
Juan Jose Porta
Elena Lucena 
Severo Fernandez

External links

References

1948 films
1940s Spanish-language films
Argentine black-and-white films
Films directed by Manuel Romero
Argentine drama films
1948 drama films
1940s Argentine films